Zeyer is a surname. Notable people with the surname include:

Andreas Zeyer (born 1968), German footballer
Julius Zeyer (1841–1901), Czech writer, poet, and playwright
Michael Zeyer (born 1968), German footballer, twin brother of Andreas
Werner Zeyer (1929–2000), German politician

See also
Meyer (surname)